The 2022 Vuelta Asturias Julio Alvarez Mendo was a road cycling stage race that took place between 29 April and 1 May 2021 in the Asturias region of northwestern Spain. It was the 64th edition of the Vuelta Asturias and was part of the 2022 UCI Europe Tour calendar as a category 2.1 event.

Teams 
Two UCI WorldTeam, seven UCI ProTeams, and five UCI Continental teams made up the fifteen teams that participated in the race. All but three teams fielded the maximum of seven riders: ,  and  entered six and  entered five. There was a total of 100 riders that started the race.

UCI WorldTeams

 
 

UCI ProTeams

 
 
 
 
 
 
 

UCI Continental Teams

Route 

2022
Vuelta a Asturias
Vuelta a Asturias
Vuelta a Asturias
Vuelta a Asturias